Gonodactylus is a genus of mantis shrimp, containing the following species:

 Gonodactylus acutirostris de Man, 1898
 Gonodactylus botti Manning, 1975
 Gonodactylus childi Manning, 1971
 Gonodactylus chiragra (Fabricius, 1781)
 Gonodactylus platysoma Wood-Mason, 1895
 Gonodactylus smithii Pocock, 1893

References

Stomatopoda